St. Josephs High School is situated in Trimulgherry, Telangana, India. It was established in 1979 by Rev. S. Arulappa, Archbishop of Hyderabad. The School is recognised by the Government of Andhra Pradesh vide RJD Hyd. No. 3141/B2/93, dated 28 July 1993.

Father S. Bernard is principal.

This school encourages co-curricular activities along with formal education.

See also
Education in India
List of schools in India
List of institutions of higher education in Telangana

References

External links 

Catholic secondary schools in India
High schools and secondary schools in Telangana
Christian schools in Telangana
Hyderabad district, India
Educational institutions established in 1979
1979 establishments in Andhra Pradesh